John Chen may refer to:

 John Chen Shi-zhong (1917–2012), Chinese Roman Catholic bishop
 John Chen (pianist) (born 1986), Malaysia-born New Zealand concert pianist
 John S. Chen, CEO of BlackBerry, former CEO of Sybase
 Chen Chwen-jing or Jonathan Chen, Taiwanese politician
 John Chen, a character in Noble House by James Clavell
 John Chen, a hero of the 2022 Laguna Woods shooting

See also
John Chan (disambiguation)
John Cheng, actor